is a Japanese jockey who has won 29 Grade 1 races in Japan and abroad. He is affiliated with the Japan Racing Association (JRA) in Rittō. His father is former jockey  who was said to be a "genius" during his active career, and his uncle is Takashi Kitamura, also a former jockey. His wife is former Fuji TV announcer . Since July 2016, he has a management contract with Horipro, the entertainment production in which his wife is also affiliated.

On December 8, 2022, following his trainer license issue being issued by the JRA, Fukunaga announced that he would retire as a jockey at the end of February next year and make a transition in to becoming a horse trainer. Two months later, Fukunaga rode his final races in Japan at the February Stake on the 19th of February, and finished his racing career at the Riyadh Dirt Sprint on February 25, 2023, where he rode Remake which finished 3rd behind Elite Power. Retirement ceremonies of Fukunaga were held at Tokyo Racecourse on the 19th of February and on the Hanshin Racecourse on March 4th.

Achievements

Grade 1 race victories
 Japan
 Asahi Hai Futurity Stakes - (3) - Eishin Preston (1999), Eishin Champ (2002), Fusaichi Richard (2005)
 February Stakes - (2) - Meisho Bowler (2005), Cafe Pharoah (2022) 
 Hanshin Juvenile Fillies - (3) - Peace of World (2002), Rêve d'Essor (2010), Joie de Vivre (2011)
 Japan Breeding farms' Cup Classic - (1) - K T Brave (2018)
 Japan Breeding farms' Cup Sprint - (1) - Sterling Rose (2002)
 Japan Cup - (1) - Contrail (2021)
 Kawasaki Kinen - (1) - K T Brave (2018)
 Kikuka Shō - (2) - Epiphaneia (2013), Contrail (2020)
 NHK Mile Cup - (1) - Rhein Kraft (2005)
 Oka Sho - (2) - Primo Ordine (1999), Rhein Kraft (2005)
 Queen Elizabeth II Commemorative Cup - (1) - Fusaichi Pandora (2006)
 Satsuki Sho - (2) - Contrail (2020),  Geoglyph (2022)  Shuka Sho - (1) - Vivlos (2016) Sprinters Stakes - (1) - Pixie Knight (2021) Takamatsunomiya Kinen - (3) - Sunningdale (2004), Big Arthur (2016), Mr Melody (2019) Teio Sho - (1) - K T Brave (2017) Tenno Sho  Autumn - (1) - Just A Way (2013) Tenno Sho  Spring - (1) - World Premiere (2021) Tokyo Yūshun - (3) - Wagnerian (2018), Contrail (2020), Shahryar (2021)
 Yasuda Kinen - (2) - Strong Return (2012), Indy Champ (2019) Yushun Himba - (3) - Daiwa el Cielo (2004), Cesario (2005), Robe Decollete (2007) Hong Kong
 Hong Kong Mile - (1) - Eishin Preston (2001) Queen Elizabeth II Cup - (2) - Eishin Preston (2002 & 2003) United States
 American Oaks Invitational Stakes - (1) - Cesario (2005) United Arab Emirates
 Dubai Duty Free Stakes - (1) - Just A Way (2014)Riding results

MagazinesWeekly Playboy "Keiba no Shinzui" (as 2nd author) → "Yuichi Fukunaga no Leading Itchokusen" (both series ended)

Photo albumsYuichi Fukunaga'' (Shot by Eiko Wada. Kodansha, 1997)

See also
List of jockeys

References

External links

 
 
 

Horipro artists
Japanese jockeys
Horse trainers
Sportspeople from Shiga Prefecture
1976 births
Living people